The New Orleans Public Belt Railroad  is a Class III railroad, and a subsidiary of the Port of New Orleans.  It connects with six Class I railroads serving the city, and provides switching and haulage service. It is estimated that one-third of the United States' east-west rail freight crosses the Mississippi on the Huey P. Long Bridge segment of the railroad.

The impetus for the NOPB came at the start of the 20th century era when multiple railroads terminating locally created both congestion at the Port of New Orleans and safety problems on city streets.  The railroad began operation in 1908 with the intention of giving the major railroads "uniform and impartial" access to the port.

The railroad is managed by the Public Belt Railroad Commission, which also owns and maintains the Huey P. Long Bridge.  NOPB covers over 160 kilometers (100 mi) of track with ten  locomotives.  No funding is received from the city; operating and capital expenses are covered by operating revenues.

Hurricanes Katrina and Rita in 2005 caused an estimated $450 million in damage to NOPB equipment and track.  At least 70 percent of the railroad’s lines and interchanges were back in operation by September 2005, and 90 percent by March 2006. The New Orleans Public Belt Railroad operates a fleet of EMD and Motive Power Industries built Locomotives. They own EMD SW1200s, SW1000s, SW1500s, GP40-2s, GP16s, and a single GP40, GE C40-8s along with MPI MP1500Ds and MP2000Ds all on their active roster.

Railroads served
Connections and interchanges are made with the following railroads:
 BNSF Railway
 CSX Transportation
 Canadian National/Illinois Central
 Kansas City Southern
 Norfolk Southern
 Union Pacific
 Amtrak

References

External links

Louisiana railroads
Switching and terminal railroads